Sahabi is a surname. Notable people with the surname include:

Ezzatollah Sahabi (1930–2011), Iranian politician and journalist
Fereydun Sahabi (born 1937), Iranian academic, writer, translator, and social activist
Haleh Sahabi (1958–2011), Iranian humanitarian and democracy activist
Yadollah Sahabi (1905–2002), Iranian scholar, writer, reformist, and politician